Baron Frigyes Korányi de Tolcsva (Kornfeld; Nagykálló, 20 December 1828 – Budapest, 13 May 1913) was a Hungarian physician specializing in internal medicine, especially pulmonary medicine. The Korányi's sign is named after him.

He was the father of Frigyes Korányi, Jr., a Hungarian politician and Minister of Finance, and of the physician Sándor Korányi.
The family was originally named Kornfeldt and was Jewish, but in connection and actively participating in, the nationalistic Hungarian Revolution of 1848, the whole family changed name to Korányi and converted to Roman Catholicism.

References

External links
Biography
Frigyes Korányi Sanatorium

1828 births
1913 deaths
Hungarian pulmonologists
Physicians from Budapest
Hungarian Jews
Members of the Hungarian Academy of Sciences
Frigyes 1